Northside Methodist Academy is a K3-12 private Christian school located in Dothan, Alabama, on Redmond Road, started in 1975. Its mission statement is "To train students in the knowledge of God and the Christian way of life while giving every student an excellent education." It is currently accredited with the American Association of Christian Schools and the Southern Association of Colleges and Schools.

References

Buildings and structures in Dothan, Alabama
Educational institutions established in 1975
Schools in Houston County, Alabama
Private high schools in Alabama
Private middle schools in Alabama
Private elementary schools in Alabama
1975 establishments in Alabama
Christian schools in Alabama